João Albuquerque (born 25 December 1986) is a Portuguese politician who serving as a Member of the European Parliament for the Socialist Party since 2022.

See also 

 List of members of the European Parliament for Portugal, 2019–2024

References 

1986 births
Living people
MEPs for Portugal 2019–2024
Socialist Party (Portugal) MEPs
Socialist Party (Portugal) politicians
21st-century Portuguese politicians